Boswellia sacra (also frankincense and olibanum-tree) is a tree in the Burseraceae family, which is the primary tree in the genus Boswellia from which is frankincense (a resinous dried sap) is harvested.  The olibanum tree is plant native to the Arabian Peninsula, specifically to the countries of Oman and Yemen, and to the Horn of Africa, specifically Somalia).

Description
The tree has compound leaves and an odd number of leaflets that grow opposite to one another; the small, yellow-white flowers are gathered in axillary clusters composed of five petals, ten stamens, and a cup with five teeth; new leaves feature a downy covering. On a steep slope, individual Boswellia sacra trees usually develop buttress roots that extends from the roots up into the base of the stem, which forms a cushion that adheres to the rock and ensures the stability of the tree.

Occurrence and habitat
Boswellia sacra is abundant in Oman in arid woodland, on the steep, precariously eroding slopes in the mountains of Dhofar, but it is most prevalent in  Eastern and northern Somalia.

In Somalia, frankincense is harvested in mainly Bari and in east of Sanaag regions: mountains lying at the east of Bosaso; and west to laasqorey; and calmadow mountain range, a westerly escarpment that runs parallel to the coast; also middle segment of the frankincense-growing escarpment; Karkaar mountains or eastern escarpment, which lies at the eastern fringe of the frankinscence escarpment.

In Dhofar, Oman, frankincense species grow North of Salalah and were traded in the ancient coastal city of Sumhuram, now Khor Rori.

Resin
The trees start producing resin when they are about 8 to 10 years old.

The resin is extracted by making a small, shallow incision on the trunk or branches of the tree or by removing a portion of the crust of it.  The resin is drained as a milky substance that coagulates in contact with air and is collected by hand.
 
Growing conditions vary significantly, affecting both tree development and resin produced.  Trees in the narrow fog-laden zone where the desert meets Dhofar mountain range, a region known as the Nejd, grow extremely slowly and produce very high quality resin in large, white clumps.  Omanis and other Gulf State Arabs consider this to be superior to all other resins produced in North and Northeast Africa, India, and Asia, and it is priced accordingly.
The most widely accepted opinion is that the vast boswellia forests which have existed for millennia in modern day Somalia produce a superior quality resin. Many reports have suggested that there is an existing phenomenon of middle eastern traders reselling the superior Somali product and marketing it as a product grown indigenously in their own respective lands.

Threats 
There are many initiatives taken by owners of the lands where Boswellia sacra grows, and organizations like the international banks have invested in harvesting new trees and making protection tools for the regions where the trees are mostly growing. It has helped in the increase of production of the resin.

In culture 
According to Greek mythology, the frankincense had once been a mortal woman named Leucothoe. The god of the sun Helios fell in love with her, and left his previous lover Clytie. In bitterness, Clytie informed Leucothoe's father Orchamus who buried his daughter alive. Helios arrived too late to save her, but not wanting to leave her rot underneath the soil, he turned her into an incense tree so that she could still breathe air.

In Christian culture, it is recorded in the Gospel of Matthew that magi that came to worship Jesus of Nazareth as a child brought gifts. Frankincense was one of those gifts. This was to symbolise the deity of Jesus even though he is thought to have been a very young boy at the time.

Gallery

References

sacra
Plants described in 1867
Flora of Oman
Flora of Somalia
Trees of the Arabian Peninsula
Medicinal plants of Africa
Near threatened plants
South Arabia